Default may refer to:

Law 
 Default (law), the failure to do something required by law
 Default (finance), failure to satisfy the terms of a loan obligation or failure to pay back a loan
 Default judgment, a binding judgment in favor of either party based on some failure to take action by the other party
 Default rule, a rule of law that can be overridden by a contract, trust, will, or other legally effective agreement

Science, technology 
 Default (computer science), a preset setting or value that will be used if no choice is done during program use or installation and setup
 Default password, allows the device to be accessed during its initial setup, or after resetting to factory defaults
 defaults (software), a command line utility for plist (preference) files for macOS and GNUstep

Music 
 "Default" (Atoms for Peace song), 2012
 Default (band), a Canadian post-grunge and alternative rock band
 "Default" (Django Django song), 2012
 By Default, a 2016 album by Band of Skulls

Other uses
 Default (2014 film), an American action thriller film
 Default (2018 film), a South Korean drama film
 Default (tennis), a disqualification in the game of tennis

See also
 
 Walkover or win by default, in sport